The 2011 Rally Islas Canarias, was the second round of the 2011 Intercontinental Rally Challenge (IRC) season. The twelve stage asphalt rally took place on the island of Gran Canaria between 14 and 16 April 2011. The rally was also a round of the Spanish Asphalt Championship.

The beginning
The rally was based in the capital, Las Palmas, with a ceremonial launch on Thursday 14 April 2011. A total of seventy-six cars contested the event made up of thirty-five IRC entries and a further forty-one from the Spanish championship. Current IRC champion Juho Hänninen was seeded number one.

Results
With four stage victories, Juho Hänninen won on asphalt for the first time in the Intercontinental Rally Challenge, just edging out Škoda Motorsport team-mate Jan Kopecký by 1.5 seconds. Third and fourth places went to the Belgian pairing of Thierry Neuville and Freddy Loix.

Overall

Special stages

References

External links 
 The official website for the rally
 The official website of the Intercontinental Rally Challenge
 Results analysis, times comparative and drivers evolution charts

Canary Islands
Canary Islands